Walter Williams West (12 April 1861 – 5 September 1934) was an Australian politician. He was a Nationalist Party member of the Victorian Legislative Assembly for Gippsland South from 1922 until 1927, when he was defeated at the state election by the independent Henry Bodman. When Bodman died less than seven months later, West regained the seat at the resulting by-election, and held it until the next election, when he was defeated by the Country Party candidate, Herbert Hyland, on preferences from the Labor Party.

West was born in Mortlake, Victoria to David Venson West and Mary Blewitt, emigrant farmers from England. He moved to Traralgon in 1884 and became a blacksmith, wheelwright and coach builder. He contracted a serious illness, and being confined to bed, was unable to continue his career as a blacksmith. Inspired by the American blacksmith Elihu Burritt, West worked to "exchange the sledgehammer for the pen", and become proficient in administration and politics.

In 1907 he obtained a municipal clerk's certificate and became a long-serving secretary of the Shire of Traralgon for over 27 years. He was a founding member and president of the committee of the Traralgon Mechanics Institute, serving on the committee for over 50 years.

References

1861 births
1934 deaths
Members of the Victorian Legislative Assembly
Nationalist Party of Australia members of the Parliament of Victoria
Australian blacksmiths
Australian people of English descent
People from Mortlake, Victoria